John Reginald Murphy (born 1933), usually known as Reg Murphy, is a publisher and business executive.

Professional life

Journalism and editing 
A native of Gainesville, Georgia and a graduate of Mercer University, Murphy began his career in journalism with the Macon Telegraph. He became editor of the Atlanta Constitution, editor and publisher of The San Francisco Examiner, and publisher and CEO of The Baltimore Sun.

Murphy was president and CEO of the National Geographic Society from 1996 to 1998.

Golf 
From 1994 to 1995, Murphy served as the president of the United States Golf Association. He authored a biography of Griffin Bell, Uncommon Sense: The Achievement of Griffin Bell.

Academics 
On 2012 he served as Executive-in-Residence at the College of Coastal Georgia.

Kidnapping
Murphy was kidnapped on February 20, 1974, at the age of 40, and was freed two days later after the Atlanta Constitution paid $700,000 ransom.

Murphy was well known for his stance against the Vietnam War, but the motive for the kidnapping is still unknown.  William A. H. Williams was arrested for the crime only six hours after Murphy was released, and all of the money was recovered.

Williams was convicted and sentenced to 40 years in jail but served only nine; his wife Betty received probation for not reporting her husband to police. Williams claimed to represent a right-wing militia group called The American Revolutionary Army, protesting against "too leftist and too liberal" media outlets and a government which was a “fraud and a murderer on a mass scale”, and sought to have all federal elected officials resign.

On 2019, contacted by a journalist, Williams apologised for the kidnapping.

Family
Murphy has a wife named Diana and two daughters.

See also
List of kidnappings

References

1933 births
1970s missing person cases
20th-century American journalists
American male journalists
Formerly missing people
The Atlanta Journal-Constitution people
American people taken hostage
Kidnapped businesspeople
Living people
Missing person cases in Vietnam
People from Gainesville, Georgia
The Baltimore Sun people